APA Group is a company in Australia which owns and operates natural gas and electricity assets. It is Australia's largest natural gas infrastructure business. 

It was founded in 2000, when spun off from the Australian Gas Light Company and listed on the Australian Securities Exchange.

Pipelines owned or operated by APA Group include:
SEAGas pipeline
Roma to Brisbane Pipeline
Riverland Pipeline
South West Queensland Pipeline
Orbost Gas Plant

Electricity transmission assets include:
Murraylink electricity interconnector
Terranora interconnector
Basslink electricity interconnector 

Power stations owned by APA Group include:
Emu Downs Wind Farm
Hallett Wind Farm, Hallett, South Australia
Diamantina Power Station, Mount Isa, Queensland
Leichhardt Power Station, Mount Isa, Queensland
X41 Power Station
Daandine Power Station

APA is the developer and operator for a pipeline between the proposed AGL Energy gas import terminal at Crib Point and the existing gas transmission network at Pakenham southeast of Melbourne.

References

External links

 

Companies listed on the Australian Securities Exchange
Natural gas companies of Australia
Holding companies of Australia
Non-renewable resource companies established in 2000
Energy companies established in 2000
Holding companies established in 2000
Australian companies established in 2000
Companies based in Sydney